Patan is a town and a nagar panchayat in Jabalpur district in the Indian state of Madhya Pradesh.
Patan is 30 km from Jabalpur on State Highway 37A which connects Damoh to Jabalpur.

Geography
It has an average elevation of 652 metres (2139 feet).

Demographics
 India census, Patan had a population of 13,215. Males constitute 53% of the population and females 47%. Patan has an average literacy rate of 66%, higher than the national average of 59.5%: male literacy is 72%, and female literacy is 58%. In Patan, 14% of the population is under 6 years of age.

Economy
Agriculture is core of Patan's economy. Area surrounding Patan is very fertile and Patan is hub for Grains-Trading. Patan has Krishi-Upaj Mandi as well as many Grain-Traders who purchase grains mainly wheat, pulses, grams, soybean from farmers and supply to major Grain-Markets of India.

References

Cities and towns in Jabalpur district